Joanna Poyago-Theotoky is an economist and researcher, currently a visiting fellow at the Australian National University and a visiting professor at the University of East Anglia.  Previously, she has held positions at the University of St Andrews, University of Nottingham, University of Bristol, Loughborough University and La Trobe University, Melbourne.  She has served as a member of the Economics Learning Standards Working Party commissioned by the Australian Government to develop new learning standards for Economics Bachelor and Master's degrees.

She was born on the island of Corfu, Κέρκυρα and is a descendant of an old and noble political Corfiot family, the Theotokis, as well as the Dousmani family (Sofoklis Dousmanis, Viktor Dousmanis).
 
Her research interests lie in the areas of Industrial organization (especially Technological innovation, R&D cooperation and research joint ventures, technology
and environmental policies); applied microeconomic theory and the economics of science and knowledge transfer.  Poyago-Theotoky has published her research in leading international academic journals.

References

Academics of the University of Bristol
Alumni of the University of Bristol
Living people
Year of birth missing (living people)